The United States Open was a crossword puzzle-solving tournament that lasted from  to . Sponsored by Games Magazine and directed by Will Shortz, it attracted thousands of potential competitors and was, along with the American Crossword Puzzle Tournament, one of the two largest crossword tournaments in recent decades.

A qualifying puzzle ran in Games Magazine.  Solvers of the puzzle could decide whether they wanted to be Nonparticipants or Participants.  Nonparticipants with correct solutions were eligible for a random drawing, the winner of which would receive a cash prize.  Participants with correct solutions were mailed four very difficult tiebreaker crosswords, many of which had deliberately tricky crossings and unannounced gimmicks (for example, the long entries in a puzzle might reveal that all of the across clues were in reverse order).  The 250 solvers with the best scores on the tiebreak puzzles were invited to New York City to participate in the tournament.

First prize at the tournament was $1500 and a six-foot-tall pencil.

Winners of the U.S. Open
 1982: Stanley Newman
 1983: John McNeill
 1984: Rebecca Kornbluh
 1985: Rebecca Kornbluh
 1986: Rebecca Kornbluh

Crossword competitions